Thuy Thi Thu Tran (born October 29, 1991), known mononymously as thuy, is a Vietnamese American singer and songwriter based in Los Angeles, California. She is best known for her song "universe", which has over 30 million streams on streaming platforms.

Early life 
thuy was born in Stockton, California, but grew up in a small east bay town of Newark, California. Her parents are both of Vietnamese descent and are refugees from Vietnam.  Thuy grew up with five siblings in a traditional household with traditional values and culture. She graduated from Newark Memorial High School and was a competitive wrestler in high school. Thuy attended the University of California, Santa Barbara, and majored in Biopsychology.

thuy began singing at a young age. An essential part of her music-making journey stemmed from growing up in a Vietnamese household that favored karaoke as mainstay pastime. In high school, thuy cultivated her natural singing abilities through her high school choir.

Career

2015-2020: Medical pursuits and early beginnings 
Her early career goals were aimed at a career in medicine as a physician assistant. After graduating college, she held a number of jobs in the medical field. She often changed jobs due to her lackluster interest in her roles and has worked in the fields of dentistry, dermatology, and ophthalmology as an optometric technician. thuy maintained her various roles during the day, and took up songwriting and recording as a hobby during the evenings.  During that time, she released various cover videos on social media.

In 2015, thuy released her song "Hands on Me". The song gained widespread support in her Bay Area community after winning KMEL 106.1's Home Turf contest. Following the song's success, thuy moved to Los Angeles with her boyfriend and childhood friend to pursue music-making full-time.

In 2017, she released "All Night Long", which had slow initial traction. In 2020, the song gained a resurgence after a slowed-down version of the song went viral on TikTok.

2021: i hope u see this debut EP 
In 2021, thuy released four singles before nine-track debut EP, i hope u see this. The project was released on October 29, 2021, the same day as her birthday. i hope u see this was released with an accompanying music video, which thuy co-directed herself. The music video portrays a younger version of thuy, who is played by her real life cousin.

2022–present: girls like me don't cry and touring 

After the release of i hope u see this, thuy released a deluxe version of the EP and began her touring career. In May, she embarked on her first tour with four sold out dates.

In August, she performed at Outside Lands Music Festival in San Francisco and Head in the Clouds in Pasadena, California.

In the fall of 2022, thuy released her second EP, girls like me don't cry. The EP was supported with a sold out North American west-coast tour.

That year, she was also was also named as one of Vevo's DSCVR Artists to Watch 2023.

On March 2023, she made the debut in Vietnamese music market by releasing a remix of girls like me don't cry featuring Min. In addition, girls like me don't cry also entered the Billboard Vietnam Hot 100 and peaked at number 9.

Artistry 
thuy grew up listening to R&B and pop from the early 1990s and 2000s and cites her early musical inspirations as Britney Spears, Mariah Carey, Brandy, Tamia, Christina Aguilera.  She has been described by Paper as having a "signature, nostalgic sound — catchy R&B melodies, agile runs and dreamlike soundscapes". thuy has expressed admiration for contemporaries such as Kehlani.

Discography

Extended Plays

Singles

Touring 

Headline Tours
 i hope u see this tour (2021)
 girls like me don't cry tour (2022-2023)

Festivals
Outside Lands Music Festival (2022)
Head in the Clouds (2022)
Sol Blume (2023)

References 

1991 births
21st-century American singers
American contemporary R&B singers
American musicians of Vietnamese descent
Living people
People from Newark, California
Singer-songwriters from California
Vietnamese-American culture in California